FX Interactive is a Spanish video game publisher founded in 1999. It published Navy Moves, and FX Fútbol.

In 2014 the publisher stopped paying its employees. In 2015 it suffered an economic crisis. As of 2018, it is on the verge of economic failure. In May 2017 and after having been the subject of several convictions for non-payments, the company is finally declared insolvent by the 24th Social Court of Madrid after accumulating a debt of more than 54,000 euros. By 2021 it was revived.

References

External links
 

Video game companies of Spain
Video game companies established in 1999
Companies based in Madrid
Spanish companies established in 1999